Wayne Jones (born 24 December 1959) is a former Welsh professional snooker player. He won the Welsh Amateur snooker championship in 1983 by defeating Terry Parsons in the final, and turned professional in 1984. Despite never breaking into the top 16, he reached the last 16 and quarter-finals of many ranking events. His most notable run was to the final of the 1989 Classic with victories over the likes of Jimmy White, where he lost to Doug Mountjoy 11–13, despite at one stage leading 11–9. He qualified for the World Championship on four occasions, but only ever progressed beyond the first round once, in 1989, with a 10–9 victory over Neal Foulds, but was beaten 13–3 by Dean Reynolds in the last 16.

References

1959 births
Living people
Welsh snooker players
Sportspeople from Cardiff